The 2014–15 season was Hapoel Nazareth Illit's 52nd football season since its establishment, and the sixth consecutive season in Liga Leumit.

Review and events

 In early May 2014, coach Shimon Edri signed with the club for one season.
 On 13 October 2014, the match away against Hapoel Ramat Gan was abandoned due to power failure. The Israel Football Association initially awarded the match to Nazareth Illit, but, after a successful appeal by Ramat Gan, the decision was overturned and the match was ordered to be replayed.
 On 28 January 2015, with the team at the 15th position in the league, Coach Shimon Edri was fired and replaced by Ofer Talker.
 On 22 May 2015, in the last match of the season, the club had beaten Hapoel Rishon LeZion 2–1 to finish the season in the 14th place and avoid relegation. The club's place meant it had to play a relegation/promotion play-off match against Ironi Nesher from Liga Alef.

Matches

League

Regular season

Relegation group

Hapoel Nazareth Illit finished 14th and had to face a Liga Alef opponent for a promotion/relegation play-off.

Promotion/relegation play-off

Hapoel Nazareth Illit won 5–1 on aggregate and remained in Liga Leumit.

State Cup

League Cup

Hapoel Nazareth Illit finished fourth and was eliminated.

Player details
List of squad players, including number of appearances by competition

|}

Transfers

In:

Out:

References

External links
 2014–15 Hapoel Nazareth Illit Season at IFA

Hapoel Nof HaGalil F.C. seasons
Hapoel Nazareth Illit F.C.